Charles Howard, 11th Duke of Norfolk (15 March 1746 – 16 December 1815), styled Earl of Surrey from 1777 to 1786, was a British nobleman, peer, and politician. He was the son of Charles Howard, 10th Duke of Norfolk and Catherine Brockholes. Howard was known for actively participating in the Tory party as part of the support for King George III. He also spent a considerable amount of his money rebuilding and refurbishing Arundel Castle after inheriting his title and lands.

Family
He married, firstly, Marion Coppinger (daughter of John Coppinger), on 1 August 1767, who died a year later giving birth. He married, secondly, Frances Scudamore (1750–1820), the only child of Charles FitzRoy-Scudamore and his wife Frances, formerly Duchess of Beaufort, on 6 April 1771 at London, England. Frances soon became insane after her marriage and was locked away until her death in 1820. Howard then lived with several mistresses. His longtime mistress, Mary Ann Gibbon (a cousin of Edward Gibbon), was reputed to be his secret third wife and she had five children by him, including two sons who were officers of arms, Matthew Howard-Gibbon, and Edward Howard-Gibbon. An older illegitimate son by a previous mistress, Sir William Woods, later became Garter King of Arms.

Politics and letters
Norfolk renounced his Catholicism to start his political life, but remained a staunch supporter of Catholic Emancipation, as well as opposing the war with the American colonies. He sat in Parliament from 1780 to 1784 and became a lord of the treasury in the Portland cabinet in 1783. He succeeded to the title of 11th Duke of Norfolk in 1786 upon the death of his father. Eventually, he was dismissed from the lord lieutenancy of the West Riding in 1798 for toasting “Our sovereign’s health—the majesty of the people” in terms displeasing to George III. He was noted for his convivial habits and his dislike of soap and water. 

Norfolk wrote Historical Anecdotes of some of the Howard Family (1769 and 1817). He was a good friend of Sir Bysshe Shelley, allowing him in 1786 to make out the patent for his baronetcy. Shelley was influenced by Norfolk and built the flamboyant Castle Goring, one side of which was a partial copy of Norfolk's residence of Arundel Castle.

Norfolk died on 16 December 1815 at age 69, without issue from either of his two legal marriages. Upon his death, his lands and titles passed to his cousin, Bernard.

He was noted for his enjoyment of the good things in life, especially food and drink, and for his aversion to washing. It was said that his servants would wait for him to fall asleep and then douse him with water. In his Confessions of an English Opium-Eater, Thomas De Quincey refers to him as saying: ‘Next Monday, wind and weather permitting, I purpose to be drunk’.

Family tree

Notes

References

External links

1746 births
1815 deaths
311
29
306
9th Earl of Norfolk
19
Charles Howard, 11th Duke of Norfolk
Earls Marshal
Lord-Lieutenants of Sussex
Lord-Lieutenants of the West Riding of Yorkshire
Surrey, Charles Howard, Earl of
Surrey, Charles Howard, Earl of
Surrey, Charles Howard, Earl of
Howard, Charles